The article offers an index of the Grand Magistry including Grand Masters and the Lieutenancies of the Order of the Holy Sepulchre.

Heraldry 

The Order of the Holy Sepulchre and the Sovereign Military Order of Malta are the only two institutions whose insignia may be displayed in a clerical coat of arms. Laypersons have no such restrictions.

Grand Masters 

In 1496, Pope Alexander VI vested the office of Grand Master in the Papacy where it remained until 1949. 
From 1949, the following Cardinals have held the office:

Grand Magisterium 

The officers of the grand magisterium are based in Rome.
Latin Patriarch of Jerusalem, Grand Prior
Antonio Franco (Archbishop), Assessor
Conte Agostino Borromeo, Lieutenant General
Conte Leonardo Visconti di Modrone, Governor General
P. Thomas Pogge, Vice-Governor General for North America
Jean-Pierre Glutz-Ruchti, Vice-Governor General for Europe
Paul Bartley, Vice-Governor General for Asia and the Pacific region
Alfredo Bastianelli, Chancellor.
Fortunato Frezza (Msgr)(Canon of St.Peter's), Master of Ceremonies of the Order.
The offices of the grand magisterium are situated in the headquarters in Rome.

Lieutenancies

See also
Grand Master (order)
List of Grand Masters of the Knights Hospitaller
Grand Masters of the Teutonic Knights
Grand Masters of the Order of Saint Lazarus
Grand Masters of the Knights Templar

References 

 
Holy Sepulchre